A Polish Uruguayan is a Uruguayan citizen of full or partial Polish ancestry.

The Polish arrived in Uruguay at the end of the 19th century.  The most recent figure is from the 2011 Uruguayan census, which revealed 497 people who declared Poland as their country of birth. Other sources claim around 5,000 Poles in Uruguay. Similar to neighboring country Argentina, often, Poles came when the Germans and the Russians ruled Poland and so were known as "Germans" or "Russians".

Most Polish Uruguayans belong to the Roman Catholic Church; they have their own chapel in the Atahualpa neighbourhood. There is also a significant Polish Jewish minority.

Polish Uruguayans have two important institutions: the Polish Society Marshal Joseph Pilsudsky, established in 1915, and the Uruguayan Polish Union, established in 1935, both associated with USOPAL.

Notable Polish Uruguayans
Arts
José Serebrier (born 1938), conductor and composer
Daniel Hendler (born 1976), film, television, and theatre actor

Business
Jan Kobylański (1923-2019), businessman
Ida Holz (born 1935), engineer, computer scientist, professor, and researcher
Chil Rajchman (1914-2004), Holocaust survivor and entrepreneur
Pedro Steinbruch, entrepreneur

Sports
Eduardo Dluzniewski (born 1952), football referee
Daniel Fedorczuk (born 1976), football referee
Francisco Majewski (1939–2012), footballer
Juan Carlos Masnik (born 1943), footballer 
Ladislao Mazurkiewicz (1945–2013), footballer
Hernán Petryk (born 1994), footballer
Gustavo Szczygielski (born 1967), former basketball player
Marcelo Tulbovitz (born 1961), football trainer
Matías Vitkieviez (born 1985), footballer

Other Professions
The sisters Paulina, Luisa, Inés, and Clotilde Luisi, prominent feminists, all daughters of Josefina Janicki (of Polish descent)
Freddy Nieuchowicz (born 1968), radio host and entertainer known by his stage name Orlando Petinatti
Wacław Radecki (1887-1953), psychological professor
Camila Rajchman (born 1994), singer and television personality
Lucía Topolansky (born 1944), politician and First Lady (2010-2015)

See also

Poland–Uruguay relations

References

External links
  

Ethnic groups in Uruguay
European Uruguayan
Immigration to Uruguay
Poland–Uruguay relations
Uruguay